The War Widow is a 1976 television film directed by Paul Bogart and starring Pamela Bellwood, Frances Lee McCain, Tim Matheson, Maxine Stuart, and Nan Martin. It was the first lesbian love story on mainstream American television.

It was originally broadcast by KCET, Los Angeles (a PBS affiliate) on their dramatic showcase series, Visions which showcased new writers. It was the second in the Visions series. Harvey Perr was a playwright.

Premise
The film is set during World War I. Amy is a proper but lonely housewife whose husband is away at war. She finds solace in a friendship with a more worldly female photographer, only to have her life turned upside down when the friendship becomes genuine love and she is forced to choose.

Reception
The New York Times called it "impressive drama".

References

External links
 

1976 television films
American LGBT-related television films
Lesbian-related films
Bisexuality-related films
Films directed by Paul Bogart
Films scored by Mark Snow
1976 drama films
1976 films
1976 LGBT-related films
LGBT-related drama films
American television films
1970s English-language films
1970s American films